Janet Anderson (1949–1996) was a successful Detroit commercial artist.

Biography
Born in Royal Oak, Michigan and raised in nearby St. Clair Shores, Anderson honed her artistic talents by studying drawing, illustration, and printmaking at the Cranbrook Academy of Arts, University of Michigan, College for Creative Studies in Detroit, and Pratt Institute, Brooklyn.  Though Anderson would cycle between Detroit and New York City during the mid-1970s and early 1980s, Detroit was her true artistic home. Residing in the western suburb of Livonia for much of her adult life, Anderson gained renown for the clarity and animation of her ink drawings, watercolors, murals, and prints.  Anderson's commercial work features depictions of famous Detroit landmarks and life along the Detroit River and Lake St. Clair. (Her grandfather was a captain of the SS Ste. Clair).

Anderson displayed her work at Detroit institutions such as the Art Institute of Detroit, the Fisher Building, Detroit Historical Museum, Detroit Bicennential Gallery, Renaissance Center, and Cobo Hall. Her work is perhaps known for forming an integral part of the Detroit Historical Society's "Documenting Detroit" and for copyrighted depictions of such landmarks as Greektown.  She received commissions from a wide range of business, publications, advertising campaigns, and individuals, having her work shown to visiting celebrities and dignitaries such as Hello Dolly! star Carol Channing and U.S. President Gerald Ford.  She illustrated such books as The Windows of Old Mariners Church.

Meanwhile, Anderson also created oil canvases & watercolors of her own, playing with sweeps of color and shape in abstracts and wild textures in street scenes and surreal portraits.

Anderson succumbed to breast cancer in 1996.  Her last inks hauntingly depict excruciating cycles of diagnosis, chemotherapy, remission, and metastasis.

References

External links
 "A Changing Detroit poses for the pen of this young Livonia Artist" by Mary Ellen Kirby The Detroit News June 23, 1977
 Archive of Anderson's work at the Detroit Historical Society
 Examples of her ink prints, part of "Documenting Detroit"
 Windows of Old Mariners Church, book illustrated by Anderson  
Archive of Detroit artworks copyrighted to Anderson

1949 births
1996 deaths
American women painters
People from Royal Oak, Michigan
People from St. Clair Shores, Michigan
American women illustrators
American illustrators
Artists from Michigan
University of Michigan alumni
Pratt Institute alumni
Artists from Detroit
20th-century American women artists